Pyrocollodion is a smokeless powder invented by Dmitri Mendeleev. A variant of nitrocellulose family of compounds, it was discovered by Dmitri Mendeleev in 1892. He and proposed its use as a replacement for gunpowder in the Russian Navy. This offer was rejected because of cost and efficiency.  

Pyrocollodion is known to be spontaneously combustible and explosive. When ignited Pyrocollodion will burn and explode quickly with excessive heat output compared to the existing gunpowders of the time. Pyrocollodion was a reasonable choice or option at the time for military munitions use. If ignited in a tight contained space, Pyrocollodion will leave little to no remnants, such as unburned powder, particular kinds of flame scarring, or smoke of any kind.

External links
 Smokeless powder, nitro-cellulose, and theory of the cellulose molecule

References
 

Dmitri Mendeleev
Firearm propellants
1892 introductions
Russian inventions